"Merck toch hoe sterck" is a Dutch war song and sea shanty, written between 1622 and 1625 by Adriaen Valerius (who adapted the "Wilhelmus", the national anthem of the Netherlands). The music is based on an Elizabethan lute song written by Thomas Campion and John Dowland in 1606 (What if a Day or a Month). It was adopted as the anthem for Bergen op Zoom.

Lyrics

References 

Dutch anthems
Dutch folk songs
Songs about the military
Sea shanties
Works about the Eighty Years' War
History of Bergen op Zoom